The ISU Junior Grand Prix (JGP) in Armenia is an international figure skating competition. Sanctioned by the International Skating Union, it is held in the autumn of some years as part of the JGP series. Medals may be awarded in the disciplines of men's singles, ladies' singles, pair skating, and ice dancing. The competition is organized by the Figure Skating Federation of Armenia.

Junior medalists

Men

Ladies

Pairs

Ice dancing

References

External links 
 ISU Junior Grand Prix at the International Skating Union

ISU Junior Grand Prix